Heinz Hoffmann (28 November 1910 – 2 December 1985) was Minister of National Defense in the Council of Ministers of the German Democratic Republic, and since 2 October 1973 member of the Politburo of the Central Committee of the Socialist Unity Party (SED).

Youth
Born in Mannheim, Grand Duchy of Baden, Hoffmann came from a working-class family. After attending school in Mannheim, he spent the 1925 – 1930 period learning to be an engine fitter at MWM (Motoren Werke Mannheim AG). From 1926 to 1930 he was a member of the Young Communist League of Germany, followed by membership in the Communist Party of Germany (KPD). During this time Hoffman served several short prison sentences for participating in demonstrations and fights.

Immigration
After the rise of the Nazi Party in 1933, he was faced with a warrant for his arrest. Hoffmann fled Germany and immigrated to the Soviet Union by the way of Switzerland and Czechoslovakia. Until 1945 he used the alias “Heinz Roth,” which is the reason why he used Heinz as his first name rather than his given name Karl-Heinz. In the Soviet Union he attended the International Lenin School in Moscow.

Service in the Spanish Civil War

For a few months in 1936 and 1937 he attended military school in Ryazan conducted by the Frunze Military Academy in preparation for service with the Republican forces in Spain. Upon graduation he was given the rank of Lieutenant. From 1937 to 1938 he served in the 11th International Brigade in the Spanish Civil War. Under the pseudonym "Heinz Roth" he was a Battery Commissar in the Hans Beimler Battalion. He took command of the Battalion after his commander was wounded. He himself was severely wounded in the legs and abdomen by infantry gunfire south of Quijorna. Hoffmann was hospitalized in Madrid for a few months then later moved to a clinic in Eaubone, France where he recovered from 1938 to 1939. From April 1939 to November 1940, he continued to recover from his injuries in the Soviet Union.

Training in the Soviet Union

Starting in March 1941, he attended a special course of the Comintern in Pushkino, northwest of Moscow. In addition to an extensive social science training he was also taught military subjects. This included training in rear area sabotage with other German exiles. He was medically disqualified from training after parachute jumps aggravated his earlier leg wounds. Hoffmann was then selected to work in German prisoner of war camps after assisting the Soviet NKVD in interrogating prisoners. From 1942 to 1944, Hoffmann was a teacher at the Antifascist School, first in the territory of Gorky, and later in Krasnogorsk. By 1945, Hoffman headed the Party School No. 12 in Moscow.

Party functionary in the Soviet Occupation Zone and East Germany
In January 1946, he returned to Berlin and was initially on the personal staff of Wilhelm Pieck, and later the staff of Walter Ulbricht. From 1950 until his death, Heinz Hoffmann was a member of the East German Parliament (Volkskammer) and was a candidate for the Central Committee of the Socialist Unity Party of Germany (SED). In 1952 he joined the Central Committee of the SED. Hoffmann belonged to the Politburo of the SED from 1973 until his death in 1985.

Military career
Starting in 1949, Hoffmann was involved in the establishment of the East German armed forces. He was first vice president of the German Administration of the Interior and head of the Department of Political Culture with the rank of inspector general. In 1950, Hoffmann was appointed head of the Main Administration for Training (HVA), the immediate predecessor of the Barracked People's Police. During the establishment of Kasernierte Volkspolizei (KVP) he was on 1 July 1952 made their chief, being promoted to lieutenant-general in October 1952. Hoffmann held that position until 1955. From 1955 to 1957 Hoffmann studied at the Voroshilov General Staff Academy of the Soviet Union. Due to this training he was not in East Germany when the new National People's Army was founded.

After his return from the Soviet Union, he served from 1957 to 1960 as the first Deputy Minister of National Defense, and from 1958 to 1960 also serving as the chief of staff. In 1959 he was promoted to colonel-general and in 1961 to army general. In 1960, Hoffmann was promoted as the successor of Willi Stoph as Minister of National Defense of the GDR serving in that position until his death. With the elevation to the office of the Minister, he also became a member of the National Defense Council.

After his death, the 9th Armored Division of the East German Army was named after Heinz Hoffmann, as well as the Grottkauer Straße in Berlin district of Hellersdorf was renamed Heinz-Hoffmann-Straße.

Family
Hoffman married Klavdiya “Klava” Ivanovna Knjazeva, whom he met in 1940 while living in Peredelkino. She died on 28 March 1952. They had two sons, Jura and Sascha. The youngest son, Sascha, died 20 years later in a traffic accident soon after graduating from officer training as a lieutenant in the National People's Army. The other driver was arrested, brutally beaten and executed by the Stasi. 

In 1954, Hoffmann married a nurse, Halina, who worked in a government hospital. They had two children and divorced in 1964.

Later in 1964 he married his chief secretary, Master Sergeant Gisela Sauer. They had three children and remained married until his death in 1985.

Awards and honors
 1954: Patriotic Order of Merit (Vaterländischer Verdienstorden)
 1965: Order of the Red Banner
 1970: Order of Karl Marx
 1974: Order of Lenin
 1974: Scharnhorst Order
 1975: Hero of the German Democratic Republic
 1975: Honorary doctorate degree (Dr. h.c.) in philosophy from the Party University “Karl Marx”
 1980: Hero of the German Democratic Republic
 1980: Order of Karl Marx
 1980: Order of Lenin
 1985: Order of Karl Marx

References
 Mannheim, Madrid, Moskau. Erlebtes aus drei Jahrzehnten. 4. Auflage: Militärverlag der Deutschen Demokratischen Republik, Berlin 1986. 
 Moskau, Berlin. Erinnerungen an Freunde, Kampfgenossen und Zeitumstände. Militärverlag der Deutschen Demokratischen Republik, Berlin 1989. 
 Klaus Froh, Rüdiger Wenzke: Die Generale und Admirale der NVA. Ein biographisches Handbuch. 4. Auflage. Ch. Links, Berlin 2000, 

Specific

External links

 
 Wer war wer in der DDR?
 
 Armeegeneral Dr. h.c., Dipl.-Mil. Heinz Hoffmann by Shawn Bohannon

1910 births
1985 deaths
Politicians from Mannheim
People from the Grand Duchy of Baden
Communist Party of Germany politicians
Members of the Politburo of the Central Committee of the Socialist Unity Party of Germany
Ministers of National Defence (East Germany)
Members of the Provisional Volkskammer
Members of the 1st Volkskammer
Members of the 2nd Volkskammer
Members of the 3rd Volkskammer
Members of the 4th Volkskammer
Members of the 5th Volkskammer
Members of the 6th Volkskammer
Members of the 7th Volkskammer
Members of the 8th Volkskammer
Army generals of the National People's Army
International Brigades personnel
German people of the Spanish Civil War
Refugees from Nazi Germany in the Soviet Union
International Lenin School alumni
Military Academy of the General Staff of the Armed Forces of the Soviet Union alumni
National Committee for a Free Germany members
Recipients of the Scharnhorst Order
Recipients of the Patriotic Order of Merit (honor clasp)
Recipients of the Order of Lenin
Recipients of the Order of the Red Banner